Noel Mbo (born 14 March 1999) is a Congolese professional footballer who plays as a striker for Panevėžys.

Early and personal life
Mbo was born in the Congo and moved to England as a child.

Career
Mbo began his career with Charlton Athletic, before signing with Gillingham in October 2015. He turned professional for the 2017–18 season, spending time on loan at non-league clubs Hampton & Richmond Borough and Kingstonian.

He made his senior debut for Gillingham on 7 November 2017, in the Football League Trophy against Reading U21s, and he scored as Gillingham won 7-5.

He signed a new one-year contract with Gillingham in May 2018. In July 2018 he said he was looking forward to the 2018–19 season. He made his League debut on 26 December 2018.

In February 2019 Mbo went on trial with Swedish club Helsingborg. Later that month his contract with Gillingham was terminated by mutual consent. On 5 March 2019, Mbo signed a three-year deal with Helsingborg. He made his competitive debut for the club as a 67th minute substitute in a 3-0 league loss to Östersunds on 29 April 2019.

On 9 August 2019, Mbo joined Division 1 side Eskilsminne on loan for the rest of the season. Three days later, he scored on his debut after coming on as a substitute in a 3–1 win over Kristianstad.

On 16 December 2021 Helsingborg announced that Mbo was being released by the club upon the expiry of his contract.

He signed for Džiugas in July 2022. In January 2023, Mbo remained in Lithuania, joining Panevėžys on a two-year deal.

Career statistics

References

1999 births
Living people
Democratic Republic of the Congo footballers
English footballers
Democratic Republic of the Congo emigrants to England
Charlton Athletic F.C. players
Gillingham F.C. players
Hampton & Richmond Borough F.C. players
Kingstonian F.C. players
Helsingborgs IF players
National League (English football) players
Isthmian League players
English Football League players
Association football forwards
Democratic Republic of the Congo expatriate footballers
English expatriate footballers
Democratic Republic of the Congo expatriate sportspeople in Sweden
Expatriate footballers in Sweden
Democratic Republic of the Congo expatriates in Lithuania
Expatriate footballers in Lithuania
Allsvenskan players
Superettan players
FC Džiugas players
A Lyga players
English expatriate sportspeople in Lithuania
English expatriate sportspeople in Sweden